Yaradullu is a village in the Agstafa Rayon of Azerbaijan, however it is de facto under the control of Armenia, administrated as part of its Tavush Province. The village forms part of the municipality of Tatlı.

References 

Populated places in Aghstafa District